The Liberty Tree (1646–1775) was a famous elm tree that stood in Boston, Massachusetts in the years before the American Revolution.

Liberty Tree or Tree of Liberty can also refer to:

  The Liberty Tree, a symbol of the French Revolution
 Liberty pole or Tree of Liberty, a wooden pole which served as a similar symbol of freedom
 Liberty Tree District, a historic district in Boston
 Liberty Tree Mall, shopping mall in Danvers, Massachusetts 
 Jefferson's Tree of Liberty, 2008 album by Jefferson Starship 
 Tree of Liberty (newspaper), published in Pittsburgh in the early 1800s
 The Tree of Liberty, a book by Elizabeth Page that served as a basis for 1940 the American film, The Howards of Virginia